The Secret Show is a British animated television series produced by Collingwood O'Hare and commissioned by BBC Worldwide in partnership with BBC Children's. The series premiered on 16 September 2006 during TMi on BBC Two. The series premiered in North America on Nicktoons Network on 20 January 2007, and ended on 29 November 2010. It also used to air in countries on CBBC, BBC One, Jetix Latin America, Disney Channel Germany, ABC1, Nickelodeon, BBC Kids, Teletoon+, MBC3, 2x2, Disney Channel Latin America, N1, TVB Pearl, RTÉ2 (as part of the network's children's programming lineup The Den), BFBS (being shown on the children's wrapper programme Room 785), Kids Central, CCN TV6 (with the series airing on the channel's cartoon lineup TV6 Cartoon Express) and TSR 2. A total of 52 episodes were produced.

Details
The series follows 2 spies, Anita Knight and Victor Volt as they try to save the world from the latest threats to civilization. They work for the secret organization, U.Z.Z., which is owned by their commanding agent, whose codename is "changed daily" for reasons of security, always to an unusual or ridiculous phrase. U.Z.Z. also comprises Professor Professor, whose inventions and scientific background frequently save the day; Special Agent Ray who often runs missions behind the scenes; and a large team of standard agents.

They frequently counter threats from their main enemy, T.H.E.M. - The Horrible Evil Menace. T.H.E.M. is headed up by the evil antagonist in the series, Doctor Doctor, who is intent on taking over the world, and has her own crack team of agents called "Expendables" who wear billiard ball-style helmets. However, some episodes do feature a different set of enemies, such as the underground species of Imposters or Reptogators, the space alien Floaty Heads or Changed Daily's nanny as a child, who has world domination plans of her own. Many episodes feature a sealed orange cylinder, known only as "The Secret Thing". It is not known what the Secret Thing actually is, although in one episode Doctor Doctor steals it, however it is a fake, filled with confetti. Even when it is not central to the episode, the Secret Thing is always featured, half poking out from somewhere. Each episode also features a robotic spider walking up the wall and a four digit code which can be entered on the Secret Show website to unlock extras.

The show never starts as "The Secret Show", but rather as "The Fluffy Bunny Show" for young children, which features Sweet Little Granny in a rocking chair, with a banjo and six fluffy, pink bunnies. As she begins to sing the intro for her show, interrupted by agents for U.Z.Z. appear, headed by Agent Ray, and commandeer the show, always using a different method of dispatch. The Secret Show then begins, much to Sweet Little Granny's dismay. The bunnies, however, frequently appear throughout the show in unexpected places. And in "A Purrfect Villain", Sweet Old Grandpa appears instead of Granny because she was getting a hip replacement operation. When the show gets interrupted by Ray, Grandpa picks up the bunnies and runs from the agents who appears many times in that episode. The US version sometimes edits this opening out of the broadcast.

Characters

U.Z.Z. agents
Victor Volt is one of the two main protagonists; wearing a blue jumpsuit, and riding a purple skybike, he is partnered with Anita Knight. He's the only American agent, was recruited by U.Z.Z at a comic book convention in San Diego, and is easily distracted and often acts childishly, sometimes getting the two agents into trouble or causing a crisis that requires further intervention by U.Z.Z. Victor's level of competence generally changes depending on the situation; in some cases he acts incompetently, whereas only scenes later he may manipulate the situation brilliantly. Victor is also a vegetarian and a "Ninth Grade Stone-Skipping Champion"(revealed in the episode "The Abyss"). Voice: Alan Marriott
Anita Knight is one of the two main protagonists; with blonde hair that ends in a cute little curl, wearing a purple jumpsuit and headband, and riding a green skybike, she is partnered with Victor Volt. Somewhat more intelligent than Victor, she often has to save the day when Victor lands them in a sticky situation. She is allergic to sea water, but when in sea water, she grows a mermaid tail (for reasons unknown.) Voice: Kate Harbour
Professor Professor is a brilliant scientist from Germany, and the only other member of U.Z.Z apart from Victor and Anita who sit in the main meeting room with Changed Daily. He has a bald head with some green hair in the back, and wear red glasses and sometimes a "Pointy Stick" that extends. He speaks with a German accent. Although something of a mad scientist, his inventions are often brilliant, although occasionally some may backfire (which is why he calls most of his inventions "totally untested und highly dangerous") and create a threat, such as a baldness cure that threatens to consume the earth with hair and giant Head Lice. His parents always wanted a professor in the family so they named him Professor, and when he became a professor at U.Z.Z. he was named Professor Professor (in which Changed Daily calls it a silly name). He once was a student at "The School for the Chronically Gifted", and a classmate of the show's antagonist, Doctor Doctor. Changed Daily is under the impression he is French. He always asks Victor "Are you still alive?" after he crashes (which is often) and is usually caused by him. Voice: Rob Rackstraw	
Changed Daily is the leader of U.Z.Z., with a strong British accent, a mustache and a classy suit. He always has a new name at the beginning of every episode; he will mention that "For reasons of security, my name is changed daily. Today, you may call me..." before then using his special cell phone to get his latest codename. This always turns out to be ridiculous, much to the amusement of Victor, Anita and Professor Professor. Prior to becoming the commander, Changed Daily was once a top agent occupying the role that Victor now has; he was partnered with Lucy Woo, Anita's counterpart, and she is the only one who knows what Changed Daily's real name is. He always travels with his fireplace at his side to lean on. Whilst he excels as the leader of U.Z.Z, real field work is no longer his strong point, since he apparently has not done much of it in many years, but in one episode he and Professor Professor are demoted when accidentally falling into a training section. Voice: Keith Wickham
Special Agent Ray is the Unit Commander for U.Z.Z. and provides back-up for Victor and Anita in the field. He is good at keeping his cool under fire and very loyal to U.Z.Z. Ray has a British accent, Elvis-styled hair, an official blue suit, head phone communicator in his ear, and wears sunglasses. Often running missions behind the scenes, he is seen at the beginning of the show when he and his agents clear out the set of "The Fluffy Bunny Show", hosted by Sweet Little Granny, by saying "this time slot is needed urgently". He is also a vegetarian (although he eats fish) and has a nephew named Roy. Voice:  Martin Hyder
Agent Kowalski is the only other female U.Z.Z agent seen in The Secret Show, besides Anita. Little is known about her, except that she is the rank of a standard U.Z.Z agent, she is an American, and is new to U.Z.Z. Voice: Kate Harbour

Other regulars
The World Leader is, as the name implies, the democratically elected leader of the entire world, and is a target for many villains. Her speech appears to be nothing but gibberish; her husband is able to interpret her supposed babbling. However, the official site implies that the World Leader is speaking ancient Aztec language, though in a very discordant manner. Voice: Kate Harbour
The World Leader's Husband is small in height, and wears some sort of armour-type outfit. He has a quiet voice and seems to be the only person who can understand what the world leader says. Voice: Rob Rackstraw
Stacey Stern is a news reporter, often seen reporting the mission currently being investigated by U.Z.Z.  Her catch-phrase sign-off is 'You may be you, but I'm Stacy Stern!', lampooning a common TV news reporter style of self-introduction. Voice: Kate Harbour
Sweet Little Granny is the host of The Fluffy Bunny Show, played before The Secret Show "steals" its time slot for television. She is married to Sweet Old Grandpa, who once hosted The Fluffy Bunny Show when Sweet Little Granny was having a hip replacement operation. When she made her debut on The Fluffy Bunny Show, she used to be known as Sweet Little Girl and, on her debut day, Changed Daily led a team of U.Z.Z. agents to steal the time slot just like Special Agent Ray currently does. Voice: Kate Harbour
Alphonse is an artist, although he is also seen producing an U.Z.Z. training film, entering a musical piece in the world anthem competition and commenting on illegal monument racing as Stacey Stern's "architectural correspondent". He is also a secret admirer of Anita and regularly shuns Victor, much to his distress. He also tortures Victor with some of his artwork (like his ball of whiteness being made of belly button fluff).
Kent B. Trusted is, unbeknownst to U.Z.Z., a double agent working for T.H.E.M. He earned the highest medal you can get as an U.Z.Z. agent when he tried to help Doctor Doctor get the Secret Thing and failed. The identity of what exactly the Secret Thing is, is yet to be found out. His name is a pun on the phrase "Can't Be Trusted".

Villains

Doctor Doctor is the main antagonist of The Secret Show and head of the evil organization, T.H.E.M - The Horrible Evil Menace. Intent on taking over the world, she is the cause of many of U.Z.Z.'s problems, but always fails. She is also known for her bad eyesight and bad teeth that seem to vibrate whenever she talks above a whisper. Voice: Kate Harbour
T.H.E.M. (The Horrible Evil Menace) is headed up by the evil Doctor Doctor, who is intent on taking over the world, and has her own crack team of agents, known as "Expendables" who wear pool ball-style helmets. Each helmet has a number except for the one worn by Kent B. Trusted. His helmet has the letter 'X' instead of a number.
The Impostors are extremely dangerous villains that live 90 miles below the surface of the Earth and can "impost" humans using "Hologrammatic Replication" with their eye-shaped symbol on their chest. They like the cold and are allergic to Penguins. Inside their suits they are small, one-eyed, maggot-like creatures, and they can change size to look like giant Maggots. Their leader is known as Red Eye and has one eye and an eye-shaped symbol on its chest. When not imposting humans, they speak in gibberish, though they can be heard to make out the phrase "ding ba-doo" which means freezing the world. The Impostors can only survive outside their impostor suits at temperatures below freezing-so their ultimate aim is to create a new ice age.
The Floaty Heads (in reality known as the Zurbulons, as revealed in the episode Secret Santa) are aliens from the planet Zabulon, and are helium-based life forms, whose helium-filled heads float above their bodies. Their leader is 12-year-old 'Prince Spong, who is extremely afraid of his mother. The Floaty Heads have never forgiven Victor for lying to them about The Ball of Spong, and Prince Spong has never forgiven Changed Daily for eating it. The Floaty Heads call humans "Sticky Heads". Also Spong's sister is Princess Ping who might have a small crush on Victor. For some strange reason the sound of impending doom is heard when they come. They hold 'popping out ceremonies' for Floaties who are going to have their head float out of their bodies. The only known ceremony is Ping's who was scared. At the ceremonies everyone shouts the person's name and rise to help them pop. Ping thought it was very hard. At the ceremonies they swap heads. At Ping's ceremony Victor or 'Pong' told her to breathe and push, as if she was a human giving birth. Popping out ceremonies are ceremonies Floaty Heads have for young floaties when they pop out. Before they become floaties like Spong they have an eyeball sticking out. There the floaty who is about to pop out their name is called about five times then rise until they pop. One of the only known ceremonies were Princess Ping's and she found it quite difficult and scary since she had a hard time popping out and was scared even saying I am a brave Princess in her room before her ceremony. After the floaty pops out the rest applaud and Spong and Ping's mother tells the floaty who they want to swap heads with (which may be either permanent or a form of greeting). At Ping's ceremony she chose Pong (who was only Victor in disguise) until the balloons popped which Victor and Anita were using as fake floaty heads. Then Ping couldn't believe she almost swapped with a sticky head. She cried in her bedroom and Victor apologized and then let Victor and Anita go lying to Spong she didn't see a sticky head.
The Reptogators most feared reptile-like creatures that live 60 miles below the surface of the Earth, and are naturally stupid, and make terrible pets due to their foul stench. They only become intelligent by sucking out the brainwaves of other creatures. They are able to run at 83 miles per hour and will sometimes where human "disguises" to blend in. Victor and Anita's belts ring every time they're in the vicinity. They are "Neighbors" to the Impostors underground due to them living 60 miles above, while they live 90 miles under.
The Chef is a villain who tried to bake Anita in a pie, but failed. His left arm is an egg beater he calls Mr. Wisk.

Others
The Kid is a boy genius who is the REAL leader of U.Z.Z. He is only featured in "Reptogator Attack".
The Secret Man is the top U.Z.Z. agent, next to the "Secret Woman in which whom Changed Daily has a crush on.
Professor Zoomottle is a character appearing in Monument Racers. He is Professor Professor's and Doctor Doctor's old teacher from the School for the Chronically Gifted. His top students, twin geniuses Aaron and Darren, were causing havoc by racing monuments across the globe using Weird Little Motor Thingies, but after U.Z.Z. stopped the monument racing, they took off with a jelly-fier. He also makes an appearance in "The Z-Ray Goggles of Power", which only was Professor Professor in a disguise.

Vehicles and equipment

Skybike
The Skybike is the standard-issue flying vehicle for U.Z.Z. Agents, similar in appearance to a jet ski, with a single jet or rocket motor at the back for propulsion, and two smaller retro-boosters on the front. Although, in the episode "Monument Racers", Professor Professor invented giant high-speed engines installed on the back of the Skybike, used to catch up with flying monuments. Skybikes are capable of vertical take off and landing, as well as being able to hover and fly backwards and have retractable tripod-style undercarriage. Most U.Z.Z. skybikes are blue, but Anita Knight's is green, and Victor Volt's is purple. Skybikes are equipped with many gadgets and equipment suitable for a large number of situations, including a Bike Cannon laser, retractable glass dome for use in outer space or underwater, claw-grips and magnets for grabbing, and even an 'Anti-Meteorite Force Field Deflector' to provide protection against space debris. The skybike was once stolen by Doctor Doctor. T.H.E.M. had also copied the vehicle but shares the shape of an arachnid, sometimes Doctor Doctor will ride on these sitting in the back of the spinneret (like a throne) while it's driven by an Expendable, similar to that of a Chariot.

Episodes

Season 1 (2006)

Season 2 (2007)

Production and awards
In 2007, The Secret Show won two Children's BAFTA Awards, one for the show itself (as Best Animated Show) and one for its web site (in the Best Interactive category).

The Secret Show has had several notable guest stars, including Tom Baker as Robert Baron, Stephen Fry as Lucky Leo, Penelope Keith as Nana Poo-Poo, Mike Reid as Mr Atom, and Felicity Kendal as Lucy Woo.

References

BBC & Nicktoons Onboard for Collingwood O’Hare's The Secret Show, Animation World Network Headline News, 8 August 2006.
Uncovering the Mysteries of The Secret Show, Joe Strike, Animation World magazine, 22 October 2007.

External links
 

 
 Nicktoons Network: The Secret Show
 Collingwood & Co: The Secret Show - Were Collingwood O'Hare
 CBBC game
 Complete Control - Creators of the Secret Show Game and the Official web site
 The Secret Show Official Soundtrack

2000s British animated television series
2006 British television series debuts
2007 British television series endings
British children's animated action television series
British children's animated adventure television series
British children's animated comedy television series
British flash animated television series
Nicktoons (TV network) original programming
English-language television shows
BBC children's television shows
Jetix original programming
Espionage television series
Fictional secret agents and spies